Nerkin Gezaldara or Nizhnyaya Gezaldara may refer to:
 Geghadir, Aragatsotn, Armenia
 Vardenik, Armenia